Equus alaskae was a Pleistocene species of horse, now extinct, that inhabited North America.

Fossils found from Alaska to Mexico have been identified as Equus alaskae, and it has been referred to as the most common equid in the southwest of North America. The species was medium to small-sized, around the dimensions of a cowpony.

See also 
 Evolution of the horse
 Equus conversidens

References 

Pleistocene horses
Neogene mammals of North America
Pleistocene species extinctions
Equus (genus)
Extinct animals of the United States
Quaternary animals of North America
Prehistoric mammals of North America
Fossil taxa described in 1989